Events from the year 1586 in France

Incumbents
 Monarch – Henry III

Events

Births
 Jacques de Bela, lawyer and writer (died 1667)
 Antoine Boësset, musician (died 1643)
 Joseph Le Caron, Franciscan friar and missionary to Canada (died 1632)

Deaths
 Jean de Ferrières, nobleman (born 1520)
 Jeanne de Gontaut, noblewoman (born c.1520)
 George de La Hèle, composer (born 1547 in Belgium)
 Gabrielle de Coignard, poet (born c. 1550)

See also

References

1580s in France